Opisthias is a genus of sphenodont reptile. The type species, Opisthias rarus, is known from the Late Jurassic (Kimmeridgian-Tithonian) Morrison Formation of western North America, present in stratigraphic zones 2 and 4–6.

Distribution
Opisthias is primarily known to have lived during the Late Jurassic in the United States (Colorado, Utah, and Wyoming). Other remains are also known from the Late Jurassic of Portugal. A undescribed crushed skull (DINO 16454) has been attributed to this genus by some sources, though this has been strongly disputed by others.

Berriasian records
A lower jaw is also known from the Berriasian aged Lulworth Formation of the United Kingdom, which appears to be distinct from the type North American species. A fragmentary dentary possibly attributable to Opisthias is also known from the Berriasian aged Angeac-Charente bonebed in France.

Diet
Opisthias has been interpreted as a generalist, with its tooth morphology indicating had an ability to process plant material.

See also

 Prehistoric reptile
 Paleobiota of the Morrison Formation

References

Morrison fauna
Jurassic lepidosaurs
Sphenodontia